Franca Capetta (born 8 December 1936) is an Italian former archer.

Career 

Capetta was born in Este in 1936. She took part in the women's individual event at the 1976 Summer Olympic Games and finished 12th with a score of 2399 points.

In 1979 she won a gold medal at the Mediterranean Games.

Capetta participated in the women's individual at the 1980 Summer Olympic Games and finished tenth with 2342 points. She retired in 1985 but continued to participate in archery.

References

External links 

 Profile on worldarchery.org

1936 births
Living people
Italian female archers
Olympic archers of Italy
Archers at the 1976 Summer Olympics
Archers at the 1980 Summer Olympics
Competitors at the 1979 Mediterranean Games
Mediterranean Games gold medalists for Italy
Mediterranean Games medalists in archery
20th-century Italian women